Sodium monothiophosphate, or sodium phosphorothioate, is an inorganic compound with the molecular formula Na3PO3S(H2O)x.  All are white solids. The anhydrous material (x = 0) decomposes without melting at 120-125 °C.  More common is the dodecahydrate.  A nonahydrate is also known.

Related salts are the dithiophosphate Na3PS2O2.11H2O, trithiophosphate Na3PS3O.11H2O, and tetrathiophosphate Na3PS4.8H2O.

Preparation
Sodium monothiophosphate is prepared by the base hydrolysis of thiophosphoryl chloride using aqueous sodium hydroxide:
PSCl3 + 6 NaOH + 9 H2O  →   Na3PO3S.(H2O)12 + 3 NaCl
This reaction affords the dodecahydrate, which is easily dehydrated.

Partial dehydration over 6.5 M H2SO4 gives the nonahydrate.  Under flowing N2, the anhydrous salt is formed.

Sodium phosphorothiolate decomposes at neutral pH.  Silicone grease catalyses the hydrolysis of the phosphorothioate ion, so it is recommended that it is not used in the glass joints.

In the anhydrous material, the P-S bond is 211 pm and the three equivalent P-O bonds are short at 151 pm. These disparate values suggest that the P-S bond is single.

References

Sodium compounds
Phosphorothioates